The Danube Gorge near Weltenburg is a narrow section of the Danube Valley in the Lower Bavarian county of Kelheim, which has been recognised as a nature reserve and geotope. This section of the valley in the southern Franconian Jura is officially called the Weltenburg Narrows (Weltenburger Enge).

Location 
The Weltenburg Narrows lies on the Lower Bavarian section of the River Danube between the town of Kelheim and Weltenburg Abbey. 

Description 
The Gebiet is a designated nature reserve and bears the catastre number NSG200.002. The area was designated as a natural monument under King Ludwig I of Bavaria as early as 1840. The nature reserve, which has existed since 1938, was awarded the European Diploma on 5 March 1978. It is part of the Natura 2000 network and the protected area of DE7136301, Weltenburg Narrows and Hirschberg and Altmühlleiten.

In addition, the area is also geotope no. 273R005. In 2002 the Weltenburg Narrows was awarded an official seal by the Bavarian Minister for the Environment for being one of Bavaria's most beautiful geotopes.
In 2006 The Danube Gorge was listed among the 77 outstanding national geotopes of Germany.

Geologically the Weltenburg Narrows belong to the Upper Jurassic (limestone), and therefore the most fossil-rich formations in Germany, which was laid down about 150 million years ago when the area was still a shallow sea.

The gorge is enclosed on either side by rock faces up to 80 metres high, pierced by numerous small caves. Between the so-called Stillen and the rocks of the Lange Wand (Long Wall) the river narrows by up to 110 metres and attains a depth of 20 metres. The limestone formations bear sometimes fantastical names such as The Three Warring Brothers (Die drei feindlichen Brüder), Pirate Rock (Räuberfelsen),  Kuchel Rock (Kuchelfelsen), Petrified Virgin (Versteinerte Jungfrau), Bavarian Lion (Bayerischer Löwe), Bishop's Mitre (Bischofsmütze), Two People Kissing (Zwei Sich-Küssende), Roman Rocks (Römerfelsen), Peter and Paul (Peter und Paul),  Beehive (Bienenhaus) (a rock with holes like a honeycomb), Napoleon's Suitcase (Napoleons Reisekoffer, which he is supposed to have left behind during his retreat to France).

By contrast with the enormous water depth at the site of the actual gorge, there is a less striking stretch of river about halfway between Kelheim and Weltenburg, the so-called Wipfelsfurt. This is the shallowest point in the Danube between Ingolstadt and Regensburg. The bowl was probably formed by a meteorite during the Ries Event 15 million years ago.

Gallery

See also 
Iron Gates – a gorge on the Danube near Orșova, Romania

References

External links 

 Landschaftspflegeverband Kelheim VöF: reserveWeltenburgerEnge(Donaudurchbruch)mitUmgriff(10).aspx Gebietsbetreuung nature reserve „Weltenburger Enge“ 
 Lage and Ausdehnung des nature reservees (OpenStreetMap) (retrieved 9 July 2013)
 nature reservee (NSG) im Regierungsbezirk Niederbayern  (retrieved 9 July 2013)
 Information page on the Danube Gorge

Nature reserves in Germany
Lower Bavaria
Canyons and gorges of Germany
Valleys of Bavaria
Danube
Geotopes
Natura 2000 in Germany
Kelheim (district)